The AUM-N-6 Puffin, also known as Kingfisher F and AUM-6, was an anti-ship and anti-submarine missile developed for use by the United States Navy in the late 1940s. Pulsejet-powered and intended to allow an aircraft to launch a torpedo or bomb from stand-off range, it was flight-tested but failed to enter operational service.

Design and development
In 1944 the U.S. Navy and the National Bureau of Standards initiated Project Kingfisher, intended to develop a family of missiles for attacking enemy ships and surfaced submarines with torpedoes or other weapons intended to strike below the waterline, while allowing the launching aircraft or ship to avoid exposing themselves to enemy defensive fire. Four missiles reached the development stage as a result of the program: the surface-launched Kingfisher E, and the air-launched Kingfisher C, D, and F.

Work on Kingfisher F began on 5 February 1947. Weighing , the missile was of conventional small-aircraft design with a high-mounted wing and V-tail, a pulsejet engine being mounted in the rear of a streamlined fuselage. The onboard radar in the missile's nose selecting a target and steering the missile into position to release its payload, carried in the mid-fuselage; while some sources state that a torpedo was intended to be carried, the specification for Kingfisher F called for the missile to carry a  plunge bomb, intended to be dropped alongside the target ship and detonate underwater, holing the target vessel below the waterline and causing flooding.

The AD Skyraider, PB4Y Privateer, and P5M Marlin were among the aircraft intended to carry Puffin; the missile's constructor, McDonnell Aircraft, proposed that Puffin be qualified for carriage by B-47 Stratojet and B-50 Superfortress bombers of the United States Air Force as well.

Operational history
Construction of Puffin was contracted to McDonnell Aircraft; flight tests of XAUM-N-6 missiles began in 1948. Tests did not demonstrate that the weapon was suitable for service, and on 1 October 1949 the AUM-N-6 program was cancelled.

References

Citations

Bibliography

Anti-ship missiles of the United States
Abandoned military rocket and missile projects of the United States
Aerial torpedoes
McDonnell Aircraft Corporation